Lecithocera isophanes is a moth in the family Lecithoceridae. It was described by Turner in 1919. It is found in Australia, where it has been recorded from Queensland and New South Wales.

The wingspan is about 10 mm. The forewings are pale fuscous with two blackish discal spots, the first at one-third, the second before two-thirds, the plical obsolete. There are some dark fuscous scales on the termen. The hindwings are pale-grey.

References

Moths described in 1919
isophanes